Jonathan David El dos Santos Duré  (born 18 April 1992) is a Uruguayan professional footballer who plays as a forward for Liga MX club Querétaro.

Career

Cerro Largo
Dos Santos returned to Cerro Largo for the 2019 season. He scored 13 goals in 32 league games for the club in his first season. At the end of December 2019 it was confirmed, that dos Santos would play for Peruvian side Universitario on loan for the 2020 season.

References

External links

1992 births
Living people
Uruguayan footballers
Association football forwards
Footballers from Salto, Uruguay
Cerro Largo F.C. players
Danubio F.C. players
Atlético San Luis footballers
Club Universitario de Deportes footballers
Querétaro F.C. footballers
Uruguayan Primera División players
Liga MX players
Ascenso MX players
Peruvian Primera División players
Uruguayan expatriate footballers
Expatriate footballers in Mexico
Expatriate footballers in Peru
Uruguayan expatriate sportspeople in Mexico
Uruguayan expatriate sportspeople in Peru